Ross Bowers (born 30 July 1985 in Luton) is a British ice hockey forward currently playing for the Milton Keynes Lightning of the EPL.

Bowers previously spent six seasons in the English Premier Ice Hockey League with the Milton Keynes Lightning before joining the Bison for the 2008–09 Elite League season, rejoining Lightning for the 2011–12 season.

External links

1985 births
Basingstoke Bison players
English ice hockey forwards
Living people
Milton Keynes Lightning players
Sportspeople from Luton